Sophia G. Romero is a Filipino writer based in Brooklyn, New York, U.S. She is the author of the novel, Always Hiding, written in Philippine English.  The 224-paged book was published by William Morrow & Company on April 1, 1998.

See also
Ninotchka Rosca
Paz Márquez-Benítez
Lualhati Bautista

References

Living people
Filipino women novelists
Filipino novelists
Year of birth missing (living people)